The Anglican Schools Commission (ASC)  was established in 1985, following the passage of a resolution by the Perth Diocesan Synod of the Anglican Church of Australia.

It was given the role of creating affordable Christian education in the Anglican tradition, and accessible to the disadvantaged and children with disabilities.

Since its establishment, the group has founded or acquired nine schools, initially in Western Australia. Each school is known as an "Anglican Community School" or "Anglican School" which is included in their name. However the Commission does not control the member schools, but rather each school has its own constitution, and is governed by its own School Council drawn from Church, parent and community sources. Instead, the ASC lays down policies and procedures in a wide range of areas, most of which relate to educational and management issues.

Since 1998, Anglican schools in New South Wales and Victoria have becomes members of the Commission association.

Schools of the Anglican Schools Commission
, the schools of the Anglican Schools Commission were:

 Cathedral College Wangaratta
 Cobram Anglican Grammar School
 Esperance Anglican Community School 
 Frederick Irwin Anglican School
 Georgiana Molloy Anglican School
 John Septimus Roe Anglican Community School
 John Wollaston Anglican Community School
 Peter Carnley Anglican Community School
 Peter Moyes Anglican Community School
 St George's Anglican Grammar School
 St James' Anglican School
 St. Mark's Anglican Community School
 Swan Valley Anglican Community School
 Trinity Anglican College

External links
 Anglican Schools Commission Homepage
 Anglican Schools Commission International

References